Sri Shaila Mahathme is a 1961 Indian Kannada-language film,  directed by  Aroor Pattabhi and produced by Neerlahalli Thalikerappa. The film stars Rajkumar, Dikki Madhavarao, Balakrishna and Hanumanthachar. The film has musical score by T. A. Kalyanam.  The movie was dubbed and released in Telugu as Srisaila Mahatyam. It marked Jayalalithaa's Indian film debut, having previously worked in an English film Epistle (1961). Her moonlight performance for one of the song sequence became a sensation of today's times. As it was Jayalalithaa's mother who accompanied the daughter for every rehearsal. While Sarot Ashwath wrote the dialogues, T. N. Balakrishna was specially credited for comedy dialogues. Mahalinga Bhagavathar played a small role in the movie.

Cast

Rajkumar
Dikki Madhava Rao
Balakrishna
Hanumanthachar
Jayalalitha
Anil Kumar
Gopala Krishna
Vimalananda Das
Upendrachar
Mahalinga Bhagavathar
Krishnakumar
Srinivasa Pille
Vasudeva Girimaji
Rajendra Krishna
Krishna Kumari
Sandhya
Sheshakumari
Lakshmidevi
Shantha
Kumari Jayalakshmi
Kumari Ganga
Kumari Suma
Papamma
Rajalakshmi
Saroja
Kamalesh Kumari
Indrani

Soundtrack
The music was composed by T. A. Kalyanam.

References

External links
 

1961 films
1960s Kannada-language films
Films scored by T. A. Kalyanam